Storsjön (lit. "The Great Lake") is a lake in Gävle Municipality and Sandviken Municipality in Gästrikland and is a part of Gavleån. The lake is drained by Gavleån. Experimental fishing has proved that there are many different varieties of fish here, such as perch, bream, sea bream and ruffe.

An old saying says that the lake has "just as many islands as there are days in a year" which should not be interpreted literally, but simply means that they are too many to count (a more accurate figure would be around 150 islands).

Old sources claim that Storsjön previously went by the name of Odensjön. This could possibly be proven by a 17th-century map where Gavleån, that flows through Gävle, is called Odensjöströmmen (lit. "Stream of Odensjön"). Storsjön is connected to Gavleån, which is connected to the sea.

Fish
By experimental fishing, these fishes have been caught:
 Perch
 Bream
 Sea bream
 Ruffe
 Pike
 Sander
 Cyprinidae
 Bleak
 Roach
 European smelt
 Crucian carp
 Rudd
 Vendace
 Tench
 Vimba vimba

Compounds related to the lake
 Sandvikens segelsällskap SSS (lit. "Sandviken Yacht Club")
 Föreningen Rädda Storsjön (lit. "Compound Save the Great Lake")

Beaches
Water samples are taken at the following beaches in Storsjön:
Hedåsbadet, Sandviken
Strandbaden, Årsunda 
Sörtuttsbadet, Sandviken

Catchment areas
Storsjön is a part of catchment area (671779-155196) which the Swedish Meteorological and Hydrological Institute calls Utloppet av Storsjön (lit. "The outlet of the Great Lake"). The catchment area Gavleån flows into the sea. The catchment area mostly contains forest (36%).

References

Gästrikland
Lakes of Gävleborg County